Verdaguer is a station in the Barcelona metro network, located under Plaça de Mossèn Jacint Verdaguer, in Eixample, named after the Catalan poet Jacint Verdaguer. It's served by L4 and L5.

It can be accessed from Carrer de Provença, Avinguda Diagonal, Carrer de Girona and Passeig de Sant Joan. It was known as General Mola until 1982.

Services

See also
List of Barcelona Metro stations

External links

Verdaguer at Trenscat.com

Railway stations in Spain opened in 1970
Barcelona Metro line 4 stations
Barcelona Metro line 5 stations
Transport in Eixample
Jacint Verdaguer